Reed Erickson (October 13, 1917 – January 3, 1992) was an American trans man best known for his philanthropy that, according to sociology specialist Aaron H. Devor, largely informed "almost every aspect of work being done in the 1960s and 1970s in the field of transsexualism in the US and, to a lesser degree, in other countries."

In 1964, he launched the Erickson Educational Foundation (EEF), a nonprofit philanthropic organization funded and controlled entirely by Erickson. The EEF's stated goals were "to provide assistance and support in areas where human potential was limited by adverse physical, mental or social conditions, or where the scope of research was too new, controversial or imaginative to receive traditionally oriented support." Through the EEF, Erickson contributed millions of dollars to the early development of the lesbian, gay, bisexual, transgender, and queer (LGBTQ) movements between 1964 and 1984. In addition to philanthropy, the EEF functioned as an information and counseling resource for transgender people; created a referral network of physicians and psychologists; published educational pamphlets for transgender people and their families; and conducted outreach to medical professionals, clergy, law enforcement personnel, and academics.

Early life
Reed Erickson was born in El Paso, Texas, on October 13, 1917. When Erickson was still quite young, the family moved to the Olney neighborhood of Philadelphia, Pennsylvania. Erickson was a good student who attended Wagner Junior High and the Philadelphia High School for Girls. In high school, Erickson started using the nickname Eric when among friends. He attended Temple University from 1936 to 1940. In 1940, he and his family moved to Baton Rouge, Louisiana, where Erickson's father had transferred their lead smelting business. In Baton Rouge, Erickson worked in the family business and attended Louisiana State University (LSU). In 1946, Erickson became the first person assigned female at birth to graduate from LSU's school of mechanical engineering. According to LSU 1946 yearbook. Erickson was Pi Mu Epsilon: A.S.M.E.: Kappa Mu Epsilon: and I.A.E.S. (see photo)

Engineering
After graduating from LSU, Erickson lived briefly in Philadelphia. There he worked as an engineer until losing his job for refusing to fire a woman who was suspected of being a communist (see McCarthyism). In the early 1950s Erickson returned to Baton Rouge, where he resumed working in the family business and started an independent company, Southern Seating, making stadium bleachers.

After Robert Erickson's death in 1962, Erickson inherited a major interest in the family enterprises, Schuylkill Products Co., Inc., and Schuylkill Lead Corp., and ran them successfully until selling them to Arrow Electronics in 1969 for approximately $5 million. Erickson continued to be financially successful, eventually amassing a personal fortune estimated at over $40 million, most of which came from canny investments in the oil-rich real estate. Over a period of years, Erickson's ongoing income was often hundreds of thousands of dollars per month.

Personal life
In 1963, Erickson became a patient of Dr. Harry Benjamin and began the process of transitioning and living as Reed Erickson. Erickson's official name change took place in 1963 with the sex change following in 1965, setting legal precedent in the state of Louisiana.

At some point, Erickson gained a leopard whom he named Henry. He and Henry were very close, and stayed so the entire time he had him. Erickson would even bring Henry on plane rides.

In 1965, he married for the first time. Over the next 30 years, Erickson married again twice and became the father to two children.

Erickson Educational Foundation (EEF)
Erickson Educational Foundation grants supported the work of the early homophile organization, ONE, Inc., and the New Age Movement (an example being paying to print the first edition of A Course in Miracles), acupuncture, homeopathy, dream research, and dolphin communication studies. However, the main centre of Erickson's attention through the EEF was transsexualism.

The EEF helped to support, both through direct financial contributions and through contributions of human and material resources, almost every aspect of work being done in the 1960s and 1970s in the field of transsexualism in the US and, to a lesser degree, in other countries. The EEF funded many early research efforts, including the creation of the Harry Benjamin Foundation, the founding of the Johns Hopkins University Gender Identity Clinic, and numerous other important research projects. It developed and maintained an extensive referral list of service providers throughout the US and in several other locales. During the years 1964–1970 and 1972–1975 alone, the EEF donated approximately US $250,000 to the support of projects about transsexualism. In particular, the Harry Benjamin Foundation received over US $60,000 during 1964–1968 and the Johns Hopkins Gender Identity Clinic received approximately US $72,000 during the formative years of 1967–1973.

In addition to philanthropy, the EEF functioned as an information and counseling resource for transgender people, creating a referral network of physicians and psychologists. It published educational pamphlets for transgender people and their families—work that was continued by the Janus Information Facility after Erickson's death—and conducted outreach to medical professionals, clergy, law enforcement personnel, and academics. Sociologist Aaron Devor has written extensively on Erickson and his influence via EEF and ONE Inc. 

In 1977 the EEF passed its work on to the Janus Information Facility, headed by Paul Walker. In  1986 Sister Mary Elizabeth Clark and Jude Patton continued some of the work of the EEF through their organization J2CP, and in 1993 Dallas Denny reprinted some of the EEF informational pamphlets.

Death
Later in life, he moved to Southern California. By the time of his death in 1992 at the age of 74, he had become addicted to illegal drugs and died in Mexico as a fugitive from US drug indictments.

References

External links
 Reed Erickson and The Erickson Educational Foundation
 Reed Erickson and the Beginnings of the Harry Benjamin International Gender Dysphoria Association
 The Reed Erickson Collection at the Transgender Archives.
 The Reed Erickson Papers at ONE Archives at the USC Libraries
 

1917 births
1992 deaths
People from El Paso, Texas
Transgender men
American LGBT rights activists
LGBT people from Louisiana
LGBT people from Texas
Activists from Texas
Temple University alumni
Louisiana State University alumni
20th-century American philanthropists
20th-century American LGBT people